Wilanowo may refer to the following places:
Wilanowo, Greater Poland Voivodeship (west-central Poland)
Wilanowo, Podlaskie Voivodeship (north-east Poland)
Wilanowo, Pomeranian Voivodeship (north Poland)